Lim Gyoung-wan (Hangul: 임경완, Hanja: 林炅玩; born December 28, 1975) is a retired South Korean relief pitcher.

Professional career 
As a relief pitcher he garnered attention in  when led the KBO League in holds with 22.

In the  season, Lim became the closer of the Giants. In August 2008, however, Lim lost the closer's role to former Colorado Rockies setup man David Cortés.

After playing two seasons with the Sydney Blue Sox, Lim became a pitching coach with Geelong-Korea.

External links
Lim Gyoung-wan at Australian Baseball League
Career statistics and player information from Korea Baseball Organization

1975 births
Living people
Sportspeople from Busan
Kyungnam High School alumni
KBO League pitchers
Sydney Blue Sox players
Lotte Giants players
SSG Landers players
Hanwha Eagles players
Inha University alumni
South Korean expatriate baseball players in Australia